Farvardin is the first month of the Solar Hijri calendar.

Farvardin may also refer to:

Nariman Farvardin, Iranian-American engineer
 Farvardin, a brand of Iranian Tobacco Company